Thomas Frey is an American futurist and celebrity speaker.

Frey is based at the DaVinci Institute in Westminster, Colorado, which he founded and where he is currently the executive director and senior futurist. Before this, he was an engineer with IBM for fifteen years.

He is part of the celebrity speaking circuit and has shared billing with Rudy Giuliani, Tom Peters and Jack Welch. Frey's clients are located both internationally and in the United States, speaking to audiences of high-level government officials such as those of NASA, executives of Fortune 500 companies such as IBM and AT&T, Lucent Technologies, First Data, Boeing, Capital One, Bell Canada, Visa, Ford Motor Company and Qwest. He has travelled to South Korea, Saudi Arabia, India, Russia, Mexico and many other countries.

Frey has been interviewed in numerous publications such as The New York Times, The Huffington Post, The Times of India, USA Today, U.S. News & World Report, The Futurist, Morning Calm (in-flight magazine of Korean Air), Skylife (in-flight magazine of Turkish Airlines), ColoradoBiz Magazine and Rocky Mountain News.

At the institute, he works to develop original research studies in areas not normally addressed by futurists. He has predicted the end of traditional colleges and printed books, but not the library.

Frey is the author of the 2011 book Communicating with the Future and Epiphany Z, 8 Radical Visions for Transforming Your Future, published in 2017.

References

Futurologists
Living people
People from Louisville, Colorado
The Futurist people
Year of birth missing (living people)